Sarcodes is the monotypic genus of a north-west American flowering springtime plant in the heath family (Ericaceae), containing the single species Sarcodes sanguinea, commonly called the snow plant or snow flower. It is a parasitic plant that derives sustenance and nutrients from mycorrhizal fungi that attach to tree roots. Lacking chlorophyll, it is unable to photosynthesize.  Ectomycorrhizal (EM) symbioses involve a mutualism between a plant root and a fungus; the plant provides fixed carbon to the fungus and in return, the fungus provides mineral nutrients, water, and protection from pathogens to the plant. The snow plant takes advantage of this mutualism by tapping into the network and stealing sugars from the photosynthetic partner by way of the fungus.  This is known as mycoheterotrophy. The snow plant is host-specific and can only form relationships with the ectomycorrhizal Basidiomycete Rhizopogon ellenae.

The plant's aboveground tissue is its inflorescence, a raceme of bright scarlet red flowers wrapped in many strap-like, pointed bracts with fringed edges, themselves bright red to orange in color.

S. sanguinea is native to montane areas of the California Floristic Province, from the Oregon Cascade Range (as far north as the Umpqua River), through the mountains of California including the Transverse Ranges (though it is absent from the California Coast Ranges between the Klamath Mountains), and into the Sierra de San Pedro Mártir range of northern Baja California.

Its species epithet sanguinea refers to the striking red flower that emerges from the sometimes still snow-covered ground in early spring or summer; this may be as late as July in high elevations, such as those of the High Sierra Nevada and Cascades. The genus epithet Sarcodes comes from the Greek sarkódes (σαρκώδες), meaning "fleshy".

According to botanist James L. Reveal, S. sanguinea is edible, if cooked.

History 
Reportedly the first account of Sarcodes sanguinea, John Torrey's Plantæ Frémontianæ is a result of the collection of Sarcodes by John C. Frémont in the Central Valley, north of the Sacramento–San Joaquin River Delta, in the area of the Yuba River in 1853. In Plantæ Frémontianæ, Torrey gives a detailed description of Sarcodes and provides the first figures of the plant. He also incorrectly states that Sarcodes is unique to California. Another early report of S. sanguinea is attributed to Gaspard Adolphe Chatin whose 1862 description did not differ from Torrey's.

In writing 
Due to its unique and striking appearance, coupled with its relatively limited geographic distribution, S. sanguinea has been a popular subject of various California naturalists. In his 1912 book, The Yosemite, famed nature writer John Muir wrote a description of Sarcodes; 
In 1939, former University of California, Berkeley professor William Whittingham Lyman Jr. published a poem book called California Wild Flowers, in which he dedicated a poem to "The Snow Plant";

See also
Monotropa

References

External links 

 Calflora:Sarcodes sanguinea
 Jepson Manual Treatment: Sarcodes sanguinea
 Sarcodes sanguinea — U.C. Photo gallery
Further photos by James L. Reveal
The Yosemite, Chapter 8 at The Sierra Club
USDA for media and geographic distribution map
Genus Sarcodes at iNaturalist

Monotropoideae
Parasitic plants
Flora of California
Flora of Nevada
Flora of Oregon
Flora of the Cascade Range
Flora of the Klamath Mountains
Flora of the Sierra Nevada (United States)
Natural history of the California Coast Ranges
Natural history of the Transverse Ranges
Monotypic Ericaceae genera